Batăr is a commune located in Bihor County, Crișana, Romania. The village is situated in the south-west of the county, near the border with Hungary. The settlement lies along the river Crișul Negru and is composed of four villages: Arpășel (Árpád; Arpat), Batăr, Talpoș (Talpas) and Tăut (Feketetót).

Notable people who lived in Batăr include composer Tiberiu Olah.

Sights 
 Wooden Church in Tăut, built in the 18th century, historic monument
 ″Markovics″ Castle in Arpășel, built in the 19th century (1896), historic monument

References

Communes in Bihor County
Localities in Crișana